Little Beaver Creek is a  long 2nd order tributary to the Fisher River in Surry County, North Carolina.

Course
Little Beaver Creek rises about 1.5 miles north of Level Cross, North Carolina.  Little Beaver Creek then flows southwest to join the Fisher River about 2 miles northeast of Fairview, North Carolina.

Watershed
Little Beaver Creek drains  of area, receives about 48.1 in/year of precipitation, has a wetness index of 398.06, and is about 26% forested.

See also
List of rivers of North Carolina

References

Rivers of North Carolina
Rivers of Surry County, North Carolina